Real Presence Radio is a lay apostolate Catholic talk radio network in the United States, with stations and translators (low power re-broadcasters) in North Dakota, Minnesota, South Dakota, Wisconsin, and Wyoming covering five states and parts of two Canadian provinces. The network's headquarters and main studios are in Fargo, North Dakota. The network also carries some programming from the national EWTN Radio network.

History
Real Presence Radio began on November 6, 2004 following the purchase of KWTL AM 1370 (then known as KFJM AM) in Grand Forks, covering most of the Diocese of Fargo and the Diocese of Crookston. On February 6, 2009, Real Presence Radio purchased KVXR AM 1280 in Fargo from Voice of Reason Radio. KVXR switched programming from the Relevant Radio network to a simulcast of KWTL, forming the Real Presence Radio network.

On October 22, 2010, the network built and signed on KPHA FM 91.3 in Bismarck. Translators (low power rebroadcasters) began broadcasting in Minot (91.1 FM) on February 20, 2011 and Williston (89.1 FM) on January 20, 2011. On October 16, 2012 Real Presence Radio purchased the KZZQ call letters (formerly used for KPUL in Des Moines Iowa) and began operating 101.9 FM KZZQ, which serves the Dickinson area, and on December 1, 2014, the network began broadcasting on 91.7 KXRP in Bismarck and on December 12, 2014, 104.1 KZTW in Tioga, ND. The network purchased a station in the Duluth-Superior area, WWEN, on February 15, 2016 from American Family Radio. Effective March, 2018, Real Presence Radio purchased KGLL in Gillette, Wyoming from American Family Radio.

Real Presence Radio is also heard on low power affiliate stations 98.9 KXYM-LP in June 2015 in Belcourt, ND and 99.7 KZEB-LP in September 2014 in Jamestown, ND.

With the new stations in the Diocese of Bismarck, the Real Presence Radio network broadcasts to a majority of North Dakota's population along with much of northwest Minnesota, northeastern South Dakota, southern Manitoba including Winnipeg and extreme southwestern Ontario.

Station list
Owned and Operated

Affiliates

References

External links
 Real Presence Radio
 EWTN Radio

American radio networks
Christian mass media companies
Christian radio stations in the United States
Catholic radio stations
Radio stations in Grand Forks, North Dakota
Radio stations established in 2004
2004 establishments in North Dakota